The second series of the children's television series Hi-5 aired between 17 April 2000 and 16 June 2000 on the Nine Network in Australia. The series was produced by Kids Like Us for Nine with Kris Noble as executive producer.

Cast

Presenters
 Kellie Crawford – Word Play
 Kathleen de Leon Jones – Puzzles and Patterns
 Nathan Foley – Shapes in Space
 Tim Harding – Making Music
 Charli Robinson  – Body Move

Episodes

Home video releases

Awards and nominations

Notes

References

External links
 Hi-5 Website

2000 Australian television seasons